Ferdi may refer to:

 Ferdi Elmas (born 1985), Turkish footballer
 Ferdi Hardal (born 1996), is a Turkish weightlifter
 Ferdi Özbeğen (1941-2013), Turkish-Armenian singer and pianist
 Ferdi Sabit Soyer (born 1952), former de facto Prime Minister of the Turkish Republic of Northern Cyprus
 Ferdi Tayfur (born 1945), Turkish arabesque singer, actor, and composer
 Ferdi Taygan (born 1956), former tennis player
 Ferdi Kadıoğlu (born 1999), Turkish-Dutch footballer

Turkish masculine given names